HDMS (Her Danish Majesty's Ship) Vædderen (F359) is a Thetis-class ocean patrol vessel of the Royal Danish Navy. She is employed to exercise Danish sovereignty in waters around the Faroe Islands and Greenland.

Vædderen (Aries) was recently refitted at Karstensens Shipyard A/S in Skagen, Denmark and sailed from Amailiehaven, Copenhagen in August 2006 on the Galathea 3 scientific expedition. Galathea 3 is now complete and Vædderen is back in service  as an inspection ship.

In August 2010 Vædderen  and HDMS ''Knud Rasmussen participated in the fourth annual Operation Nanook 2010 with Canadian and American vessels in Baffin Bay and the Davis Straits.

References

External links 
 The official Galathea 3 expeditions homepage.
 Jyllands-Posten´s Galathea 3 site 

Thetis-class ocean patrol vessels
Ships built in Svendborg
1990 ships
Frigates of the Royal Danish Navy
Research vessels of Denmark